FORL may refer to:
 Feline odontoclastic resorptive lesion, a dental disease in cats
 Fort Wayne Line, a rail line in northeastern United States
 Friends of Real Lancashire, an outsider pressure group whose aim is the restoration of the historic boundaries of the Lancashire ceremonial county
 Friends Of Radio Lutterworth
 Freedom of Russia Legion, a Ukrainian military unit formed of Russian defectors